The following is a timeline of the history of the city of Plovdiv, Bulgaria.

Prior to 20th century

 342 BCE – Philip II of Macedon in power; settlement renamed "Philippopolis."
 2nd C. CE – Roman theatre built.
 250/251 CE – Battle of Philippopolis; town sacked by Goths.
 340's – Christian church council held in Philippopolis.
 815 – Town becomes part of the First Bulgarian Empire (approximate date).
 1205 – Bulgarians in power.
 1208 – June: Battle of Philippopolis (1208).
 1262 – Byzantines in power.
 1323 – Tatar forces attempt siege.
 1363 – City taken by Turkish forces under Lala Şahin Pasha.
 1364 – Ottomans in power; town renamed "Filibe".
 1420's – Great Mosque built.
 1440's –  built.
 1818 – Earthquake.
 1832 – Church of St Constantine and Helena rebuilt.
 1835 –  rebuilt.
 1836 – St. Petka Church school established.
 1844 – Church of the Holy Mother of God, Plovdiv rebuilt.
 1846 – Fire.
 1847 – Textile factory in operation.
 1856 –  rebuilt.
 1861 – Cathedral of St Louis built.
 1870 - Plovdiv Central railway station opened.
 1875 – Greek Zariphios School established.
 1878
 Battle of Philippopolis (1878).
 City becomes capital of Eastern Roumelia per the Congress of Berlin.
 Danov publisher in business.
 Tomasian tobacco manufacturer in business (approximate date).
 1879 – Naroden Glas newspaper in publication.(bg)

 1881 – International Theatre Luxembourg opens.
 1882 –  opens.
 1885
 "Bloodless revolution at Philippopolis."
  newspaper published.
 1886 – November: "State of siege at Philippopolis on account of brigandage and Russian agency."
 1891 – City master plan approved.
 1892
 August: "First Bulgarian exhibition" opens.
 Exhibition Park laid out.
 Plovdiv Synagogue built.
 1893
 "Socialist organization" founded by Dimiter Blagoev.
 Population: 41,068.

20th century

 1906
 Anti-Greek unrest.
 Population: 45,572.
 1908 – Plovdiv Central railway station built.
 1909 – Pathé cinema opens.
 1910 – Population: 47,981.
 1912 – Amer Gaazi Dzami (mosque) demolished.
 1917 – Plovdiv Regional Ethnographic Museum established.
 1921 – FC Maritsa Plovdiv (football club) formed.
 1926 – Todor Diev Stadium opens.
 1928 – April: 1928 Chirpan–Plovdiv earthquakes.
 1932 –  newspaper begins publication.
 1934
 Annual Plovdiv Fair begins.
 Population: 99,883.
 1938 - Plovdiv Regional Ethnographic Museum new location.
 1940 – .
 1945
 Plovdiv Medical University founded.
 Plovdiv Philharmonic Orchestra established.
 1947 – FC Spartak Plovdiv (football club) and Detska Kitka Choir formed.
 1950 – Plovdiv Stadium built.
 1951 – Plovdiv Regional Historical Museum established.
 1953
 .
 Opera house established.
 1955 – Trolleybus begins operating.
 1956 – Population: 161,836.
 1957 – Alyosha Monument, Plovdiv erected.
 1960 –  founded.
 1961 – Hristo Botev Stadium (Plovdiv) opens.
 1964
  established.
 Population: 203,800.
 1965 – Plovdiv Airport new terminal opens.
 1972 – Plovdiv University "Paisii Hilendarski" active.
 1981 – Expo 81 held in city.
 1985 – Population: 342,131.
 1987 – Administrative Plovdiv okrug (province) created.
 1991
 Maritsa newspaper begins publication.
  founded.
 1993 – Population: 345,205 (estimate).
 1999 – Ivan Chomakov becomes mayor.

21st century

 2005 – "Night of museums" begins.
 2007 – Slavcho Atanasov becomes mayor.
 2011 –  becomes mayor.
 2013 – Population: 341,041.
 2014 – February: Anti-Muslim unrest.
 2019 – European Capital of Culture

See also
 History of Plovdiv
 Other names of Plovdiv e.g. Felibe, Filibe, Filippopoli, Paldin, Philippopolis, Philippoupolis, Puldin, Trimontium
 List of mayors of Plovdiv
 Timelines of other cities in Bulgaria: Sofia, Varna

References

This article incorporates information from the Bulgarian Wikipedia and German Wikipedia.

Bibliography

 
 
 
 
 
 
  (fulltext)

External links

 Items related to Plovdiv, various dates, via Europeana.
 Items related to Plovdiv, various dates, via Digital Public Library of America.

 
Plovdiv
Bulgaria history-related lists
Years in Bulgaria